David Laws is a civil servant.

David Laws may also refer to:

David Laws (rugby league)

See also
David Law (disambiguation)